Libor Koníček (born 14 July 1995) is a Slovak professional footballer who currently plays for OK Castkovce.

Career

MFK Ružomberok
He made his professional debut for MFK Ružomberok against MFK Košice on 20 May 2014, entering in as a replacement for Pavel Kováč, who was sent-off in the 36th minute of the match.

References

External links
 
 Futbalnet profile
 Eurofotbal profile

1995 births
Living people
Slovak footballers
Association football goalkeepers
MFK Ružomberok players
FK Iskra Borčice players
Spartak Myjava players
Slovak Super Liga players